The Slovak Cup is the main knockout cup competition in Slovak football. The winner qualifies for the UEFA Europa Conference League.

History
The competition was first contested in 1969. Until 1993, the winner of the Slovak Cup would face the winner of the Czech Cup in the Czechoslovak Cup final, the winner of which would be Czechoslovakia's representative in the Cup Winners Cup (Slovan Bratislava won the tournament in 1968/1969).

Sponsorship

Cup winners (Czechoslovak era 1969-1993)

Source:

Cup Winners (Slovak era 1993-present)

Key

Previous cup winners are:

Performance by club

Titles by city

Notes

References

External links
 Slovak Cup at Futbalnet.sk
 Slovak Cup at Soccerway.com

 
1
Slovakia